Bangladesh Institute of Peace and Security Studies (BIPSS)  is a non-party, non-profit organization and independent think tank devoted to studying peace and security issues related to South and Southeast Asia. The institute seeks to bridge the gap between academic research and policy analysis within the context of Bangladesh and other countries of South and Southeast Asia. Strategic thinkers, academicians, former members of the Civil Services, Foreign Services, Armed Forces and media persons are associated with the institute.

BIPSS has launched a specialized front named Bangladesh Center for Terrorism Research (BCTR) focusing in depth research to curb extremism and militancy in Bangladesh and in South-Asia.

BIPSS is headed by Major General A N M Muniruzzaman.

Background 
Bangladesh Institute of Peace and Security Studies (BIPSS) is the first institution of its kind in Bangladesh for analysis on all aspects of security, peace and security studies in the region as well as of the global. It will serve as a forum for research, training, exchanges and dialogue between practitioners, academics and activists at all levels. The institute is headed by the president, Major General Muniruzzaman.

See also
List of institutes in Bangladesh

References

External links
Publications
Events
International Conference/Seminar
Projects
BIPSS in Media

Think tanks based in Bangladesh
Security studies
Research institutes in Bangladesh
Organisations based in Dhaka